Pellic Quest was a computer-moderated play-by-mail (PBM) game that was published by Conflict Interaction Associates in 1978 as a licensed spinoff of Flying Buffalo's Starweb PBM. It was one of the first PBM games to be moderated by computer.

Gameplay
Pellic Quest was a PBM game for 10–15 players in which each participant took command of an entire alien race, jumping between over 200 worlds in search of galactic dominance. Ground combat was also a game element. 

Players started by choosing to be one of six role types. Each had different abilities, and each earned victory points in a different way. 
 The Emperor used people and material to earn victory points. 
 The Crusader conquered and subjugated planets.
 The Brigand was a pirate who raided planets, and built space fleets. 
 The  were robots who earned points by destroying planet life and building more .
 The Trader used the production potential of each world.
 The  were insectoid warriors that bred at a high rate and tried to destroy everything in their path.

Each player started on a different home world with a given industrial capacity, production capability, number of soldiers and a stockpile of material (the game's currency).

Each turn, each player mailed in an order sheet with computer codes for various orders:
 Creation of star fleets, industry and soldiers
 Movement
 Combat, either on the ground or in space
 Reconnaissance
 Getting allies
 Diplomacy

The player who amassed a certain number of victory points first was the winner.

The cost was $6 for the rulebook, and $1.50 per turn.

Reception

In the September 1978 edition of Dragon (Issue 18), Dave Minch liked the fact that the game was computer moderated, which he had not experienced before. "With this there can be no bad die rolls, no faulty judge interpretation, and no over-balanced character overrunning the game. You play against known character types and can react accordingly so that you don’t make mistakes because of total ignorance. You always know exactly what your limitations are and what you must do to counteract them." Minch concluded with a recommendation: "All things considered, the game is well worth trying and spending time on. I look for games of this type to happen much more frequently."

In the April–May 1979 edition of White Dwarf (Issue 12), John Reynolds liked the multitude of possible actions that players were allowed. He concluded, "Pellic Quest is the first game to be produced by CIA and if it's anything to go by, the hobby of computer gaming is here to stay."

In a 1979 Game Survey held by The Space Gamer and published in the May–June 1980 edition (Issue 20), readers rated the game 5.6 out of 10.

In the August 1981 edition of The Space Gamer (No. 42), Steve Jackson compared Pellic Quest favourably to its antecedent, Starweb, saying, "I'd recommend this to any StarWeb player who enjoys the original game and wants to try a variant – or to the tactics-oriented space gamer looking to 'get his feet wet' in PBM computer combat."

A reviewer in the November–December 1983 issue of PBM Universal highlighted the game's moderation and low pricing.

In 1985, the game tied with DuelMasters, Power, and Quest of the Great Jewels for Third Place in the 1st Annual Paper Mayhem Awards for "Best PBM Game".

References

Play-by-mail games